Susan Jean Picus (27 August 1948 – 17 November 2021) was an American bridge player from New York City. A graduate of NYU and the University of Wisconsin–Madison, she had worked as a software engineering manager and director at Bell Laboratories, Unix System Laboratories, Novell, and Bear Stearns. She was married to Barry Rigal, a bridge player, writer and commentator.

Bridge accomplishments

Picus won four international events as a player and placed second in another; she captained the gold medal women's team in the 1997 and 2013 Venice Cup.

She finished first or second in every one of the eight US women trials in which she played from 1991 to 2003, bar 1996.

She won her first two US titles before becoming a Life Master.

Wins
 Venice Cup (3) 1991, 1993, 2003
 McConnell Cup (1) 1994
 North American Bridge Championships (10)
 Smith Life Master Women's Pairs (1) 2009 
 Machlin Women's Swiss Teams (3) 1986, 2002, 2005 
 Wagar Women's Knockout Teams (2) 1972, 1991 
 Sternberg Women's Board-a-Match Teams (2) 1997, 2004 
 Chicago Mixed Board-a-Match (2) 1971, 2000

Runners-up
 Venice Cup (1) 1995
 North American Bridge Championships
 Whitehead Women's Pairs (1) 1983 
 Machlin Women's Swiss Teams (2) 1990, 1994 
 Wagar Women's Knockout Teams (3) 1985, 2002, 2004 
 Sternberg Women's Board-a-Match Teams (2) 1986, 1996

Notes

1948 births
2021 deaths
Place of birth missing
Date of birth missing
American contract bridge players
New York University alumni
Sportspeople from New York City
University of Wisconsin–Madison alumni
Venice Cup players